Hassan Nawaz (born 21 August 2004) is a Pakistani cricketer.  In August 2022, he was named to Northern's squad for the 2022-23 National T20 Cup. Before being selected by Northern, he played for the Mirpur Royals in the Kashmir Premier League, where he was the second top-scorer.In PSL Season 8 2023,he is playing for Islamabad United.

References

Living people
Pakistani cricketers
2004 births